The 2014 Kraft Nabisco Championship was the 43rd Kraft Nabisco Championship, held April 3–6 at the Dinah Shore Tournament Course of Mission Hills Country Club in Rancho Mirage, California. It was the 32nd year of the tournament as a major championship. Golf Channel televised the event.

Lexi Thompson, age 19, shot a bogey-free final round 68 (−4) to win her first major title, three strokes ahead of runner-up Michelle Wie. The two entered the final round as co-leaders at 206 (−10). Thompson opened with a birdie, carded a 32 (−4) on the front nine, then finished with nine consecutive pars. Wie won the next major, the U.S. Women's Open in June, for her first major title.

Field
The field of 111 players included 10 amateurs.

Past champions in the field

Made the cut

Missed the cut

Nationalities in the field

Round summaries

First round
Thursday, April 3, 2014

(a) = amateur

Second round
Friday, April 4, 2014

73 players made the cut at 149 (+5).

Third round
Saturday, April 5, 2014

Final round
Sunday, April 6, 2014

Source:
Amateurs: Minjee Lee (E), Brooke Henderson (+1), Alison Lee (+2), Lilia Vu (+6), Su-Hyun Oh (+7), Angel Yin (+14).

Scorecard
Final round

Source:

References

External links

Coverage on the LPGA Tour official site

Chevron Championship
Golf in California
Kraft Nabisco Championship
Kraft Nabisco Championship
Kraft Nabisco Championship
Kraft Nabisco Championship